Perrone is an Italian surname, it may refer to:

 Ciro Perrone (1921-2011), New York City mobster and soldier in the Genovese crime family
 Diego Perrone (born 1979), retired Uruguayan footballer 
 Dino Perrone Compagni (1879-1950), leading figure in the early years of Italian fascism
 Elisabetta Perrone (born 1968), retired Italian female race walker
 Emanuel Perrone (born 1983), Argentine footballer 
 Ettore Perrone di San Martino (1789–1849), Italian politician and military leader
 Felipe Perrone (born 1986), Brazilian water polo player
 Giovanni Perrone (1794–1876), Italian theologian
 Nico Perrone (born 1935), Italian essayist, historian and journalist
Giovanni Tommaso Perrone (1602-1677), Roman Catholic prelate who served as Bishop of Nicastro
 Paul J. Perrone, author of books and articles on various Java-based software technologies
 Serena Perrone (born 1979), American artist